Vincent Kenneth Marasigan Favis, better known as Binky Favis, is a Filipino former professional basketball head coach and politician.

Coaching career 
He was also a former player of the UST Growling Tigers and was an assistant coach of the 1993 squad, which swept the University Athletic Association of the Philippines men's basketball tournament, he also stayed until 1997. 

Favis is a former coach of the Letran Knights in the NCAA leading them to a title in 1999. He also coached in Philippine Basketball League for several teams.

In 2000, he was hired by Chot Reyes as an assistant coach for Pop Cola Panthers. When Pop Cola was sold to Coke Philippines in 2001, he stayed to be an assistant coach for Coke Tigers and won two PBA championships. 

He became the assistant coach of Jong Uichico for the Philippine national basketball team in the 2002 Asian Games. He later joined Barangay Ginebra in 2003 and won another two championship.

Before the 2005-06 season, he was named as the head coach of Coca-Cola Tigers and had several lackluster seasons with the team. In 2008, he was relieved as head coach of the Tigers.

Coaching record

Collegiate record

Professional record

Political career 
He served as a councilor of Parañaque City from the 2nd district from 2013 to 2022. Upon being term-limited, he ran for vice mayor of Parañaque in 2022, but lost.

References

Filipino men's basketball coaches
Filipino men's basketball players
Living people
UST Growling Tigers basketball players
Powerade Tigers coaches
Year of birth missing (living people)
People from Parañaque
Sportspeople from Metro Manila
Metro Manila city and municipal councilors
PDP–Laban politicians
Filipino sportsperson-politicians
Pop Cola Panthers coaches
Barangay Ginebra San Miguel coaches
Letran Knights basketball coaches
UST Growling Tigers basketball coaches